Luis Santos Encarnación (born October 20, 1963 in Santo Domingo, Dominican Republic) is a former Major League Baseball pitcher who played for one season. He pitched in four games for the Kansas City Royals during the 1990 Kansas City Royals season.

Early years
Encarnación was drafted in 1988 by the Kansas City Royals via the Rule 5 draft. He was originally signed by the Cleveland Indians and spent four years in their minor league system, including stops in Batavia, Waterloo, Waterbury, and Williamsport. After being acquired by Kansas City, he was assigned to their minor league affiliate in Memphis. He was called up to the major leagues in July 1990.

External links

Baseball Almanac

1963 births
Living people
Algodoneros de Unión Laguna players
Batavia Trojans players
Cafeteros de Córdoba players
Dominican Republic expatriate baseball players in Mexico
Dominican Republic expatriate baseball players in the United States
Kansas City Royals players
Major League Baseball pitchers
Major League Baseball players from the Dominican Republic
Memphis Chicks players
Mexican League baseball pitchers
Omaha Royals players
Waterbury Indians players
Waterloo Indians players
Williamsport Bills players